James N. McLaughlin (born November 6, 1943) is an American politician and a Democratic member of the Rhode Island House of Representatives representing District 57 since January 2011.

Elections
2012 McLaughlin was unopposed for both the September 11, 2012 Democratic Primary, winning with 888 votes and the November 6, 2012 General election, winning with 3,851 votes.
2010 McLaughlin challenged District 57 Democratic Representative Kenneth A. Vaudreuil in the September 23, 2010 Democratic Primary, winning by 82 votes with 879 votes (52.4%) and was unopposed for the November 2, 2010 General election, winning with 2,988 votes.

References

External links
Official page at the Rhode Island General Assembly
Campaign site

James McLaughlin at Ballotpedia
James N. McLaughlin at OpenSecrets

Place of birth missing (living people)
1943 births
Living people
Democratic Party members of the Rhode Island House of Representatives
People from Cumberland, Rhode Island
21st-century American politicians